Kuroshioturris kurodai is a species of sea snail, a marine gastropod mollusk in the family Turridae, the turrids.

Distribution
This marine species occurs off Japan.

References

 Shuto, Tsugio. "Origin of a subtropical fauna in the middle latitude as exemplified by the Kakegawa fauna." Bulletin of Marine Science 47.1 (1990): 10-22.
 Higo, S., Callomon, P. & Goto, Y. (1999) Catalogue and Bibliography of the Marine Shell-Bearing Mollusca of Japan. Elle Scientific Publications, Yao, Japan, 749 p

External links
  Tucker, J.K. 2004 Catalog of recent and fossil turrids (Mollusca: Gastropoda). Zootaxa 682:1-1295
 Takami Nobuhara and Koshi Kitamura. "Early Pleistocene mollusk fossils from the top of the Kakegawa Group in Shimomata, Kakegawa City, Shizuoka Prefecture." Tokai Nature Magazine: Shizuoka Prefecture Natural History Research Report 5 (2012): 45-50

kurodai
Gastropods described in 1927